The 1982 Richmond Spiders football team represented the University of Richmond in the 1982 NCAA Division I-AA football season. The Spiders were led by third year head coach Dal Shealy and played their home games at City Stadium. They were classified as Independent. The 1982 campaign marked Shealy's worst year as a head coach after Richmond finished with a winless 0–10 record.

Schedule

References

Richmond
Richmond Spiders football seasons
College football winless seasons
Richmond Spiders football